Carla Cuerva Loyzaga-Gibbs popularly known as  Bing Loyzaga (born April 9, 1970) is a Filipino actress and singer. She is being known for her Villain Roles like Babaeng Hampaslupa as Katarina, Sinasamba Kita as Isabellita and Kay Tagal Kang Hinintay as Brigita. She also starred in Tayong Dalawa as Naida. In 2020, Loyzaga portrayed the role as Doña Elvira Dominante vda. de Cruz in the drama, Paano ang Pangako?. She also played a supporting role in Stories from the Heart: Loving Miss Bridgette as Dra. Stella Morales-Villareal.

Biography
Bing is married to Janno Gibbs who is also a singer and an actor in the Philippine entertainment. They have two daughters together, Alyssa and Gabby. Her father is Carlos Loyzaga, a popular basketball player in his time. Bing has 4 siblings in the Loyzaga clan namely, Chito Loyzaga, Joey Loyzaga, Princess Loyzaga and Teresa Loyzaga.

Career
Her career started when she was discovered in a toothpaste commercial wherein she sang the background song entitled "I Smile for You."

Among her TV appearances were Tonyong Bayawak, Agua Bendita, Paano Ba ang Mangarap?, My Girl, Marimar, Kung Mamahalin Mo Lang Ako, Leya, Ang Pinakamagandang Babae Sa Ilalim Ng Lupa, Saang Sulok ng Langit, and Kay Tagal Kang Hinintay. Loyzaga is one of the co-hosts in Sa Linggo nAPO Sila from 1990 until 1995 and 'Sang Linggo nAPO Sila from 1995 until 1998.

She is well known for being Antagonistic on many TV series and films.

In 2017, Bing starred for her role as Maila, Bianca's mother in Ikaw Lang Ang Iibigin on ABS-CBN then she went back to her home network, GMA Network in 2018 to portray the role of Miranda Aseron-Del Valle in Kapag Nahati ang Puso.

Filmography

Television

Film

References

External links

1970 births
Living people
Filipino people of Spanish descent
Filipino people of Basque descent
Actresses from Metro Manila
21st-century Filipino singers
21st-century Filipino women singers
Singers from Metro Manila
Filipino television actresses
Filipino television variety show hosts
GMA Network personalities
ABS-CBN personalities
TV5 (Philippine TV network) personalities